Ananthasayana temple in Ananthasayanagudi, Bellary district, Karnataka state, India was constructed by King Krishnadeva Raya (1524 AD) of the Vijayanagara Empirein memory of his deceased son.

Gallery

References

Hindu temples in Bellary district